Oelrichs may refer to:

 Blanche Oelrichs, an American poet, playwright and actress
 Hermann Oelrichs, American businessman (1850-1906). [Don't mix up: his father and his son, in business too, had the same name!]
 Marjorie Oelrichs, American socialite and wife of bandleader Eddy Duchin
 Oelrichs, South Dakota, a community in Falls River County 
 Peter Andresen Oelrichs, sailor and author